The Shaochuantou Park is a park in Gushan District, Kaohsiung, Taiwan.

Transportation
The park is accessible within walking distance west from Sizihwan Station of Kaohsiung MRT.

See also
 List of parks in Taiwan

References

Parks in Kaohsiung